The Shire of Bairnsdale was a local government area about  east of Melbourne, the state capital of Victoria, Australia. For its first one hundred years it governed both Bairnsdale and the surrounding area; however, after that time, Bairnsdale itself had its own local government authority.

History

Bairnsdale was first incorporated as a road district on 30 April 1867, and became a shire on 14 July 1868. On 6 January 1882, the Shire of Tambo, centred on Lakes Entrance, split away from Bairnsdale. On 27 May 1914 and 1 October 1964, it lost some land to its west to the Shire of Avon. On 31 May 1967, after a poll of ratepayers, the Centre Riding and parts of the East Riding severed, to form the Town of Bairnsdale, which became a city in 1990.

On 2 December 1994, the Shire of Bairnsdale was abolished, and along with the City of Bairnsdale, the Shires of Orbost and Tambo, parts of the Shire of Omeo and the Boole Boole Peninsula region from the Shire of Rosedale, was merged into the newly created Shire of East Gippsland. The West Dargo region was transferred to the newly created Shire of Wellington.

Wards

The Shire of Bairnsdale was divided into three ridings, each of which elected three councillors:
 East Riding
 West Riding
 South Riding

Towns and localities
 Eagle Point
 Fernbank
 Iguana Creek
 Lindenow
 Lucknow
 Mount Taylor
 Paynesville
 Walba
 Wy Yung

Population

* Estimate in the 1958 Victorian Year Book.

References

External links
 Victorian Places - Bairnsdale Shire

Bairnsdale Shire
Bairnsdale